Gordon Trevor Bowra (28 June 1936 - 18 February 2014) was a British surgeon who was medical officer with the British Antarctic Survey in 1963. He was awarded the Polar Medal in 1971.

References

Medical doctors from London
1936 births
2014 deaths
British surgeons